The Air Force–Army men's ice hockey rivalry is a college ice hockey rivalry between the Air Force Falcons men's ice hockey and Army Black Knights men's ice hockey programs. The first official meeting between the two occurred on January 26, 1976 but didn't become an annual event until 1989.

History
Army was one of the first college teams in the country, playing their first games in 1904. Air Force didn't start play until more than 60 years later but, due to the vast distance between the two campuses, the teams didn't play one another for several seasons. When the NCAA reorganized into numerical divisions in 1973, Army was dropped down to Division II in part because they still used an open-air rink as their home facility. The Smith Rink served as Army's home from 1930 to 1985 but, once the program began to build the more modern Tate Rink, the program was allowed back into top division. Army then played as a part-time member of ECAC Hockey until the late 1980s, after which, the team played as an independent. This coincided with Army and Air Force beginning an annual rivalry.

For the first decade of play between the two service academies, the teams alternated hosting duties. That trend continued once they both joined College Hockey America in 2000, however, Army left after just one season to join the MAAC, an east coast conference. Air Force remained with the CHA for several years before following in Army's footsteps, joining the MAAC successor, Atlantic Hockey in 2007. Over the span of 15 years, Air Force and Army have met 5 times in the conference tournament with the Falcons winning every series.

Game results
Full game results for the rivalry, with rankings beginning in the 1998–99 season.

Series facts

References

External links
 Air Force Falcons men's ice hockey
 Army Black Knights men's ice hockey

College ice hockey rivalries in the United States
Air Force Falcons ice hockey
Army Black Knights men's ice hockey
1987 establishments in Minnesota